Horseshoe (⊃, \supset in TeX) is a symbol used to represent:

 Material conditional in propositional logic
 Superset in set theory

It was used by Whitehead and Russell in Principia Mathematica. In Unicode the symbol is encoded .

See also
List of mathematical symbols
List of logic symbols
⊂
ʊ
Ω

References 

Logic symbols